Patroklos Karantinos  (10 April 1903 – 4 December 1976) was a Greek architect of early modernism in Greece. He was born in Constantinople and died in Athens.

Karantinos studied architecture in Athens and then went to France, where he studied with Auguste Perret. He was professor of architecture at the Aristotle University of Thessaloniki from 1959 to 1968. He is particularly known for the design of many museums in Greece, including the Archaeological Museum of Thessaloniki. His work was part of the architecture event in the art competition at the 1948 Summer Olympics.

See also 
 List of museums in Greece

References

1903 births
1976 deaths
National Technical University of Athens alumni
Academic staff of the Aristotle University of Thessaloniki
Greek expatriates in France
Modernist architects
Constantinopolitan Greeks
20th-century Greek architects
Olympic competitors in art competitions
Emigrants from the Ottoman Empire to Greece
Architects from Istanbul